Aniksi (Greek: Άνοιξη; English: Springtime) is a successful studio album by Greek artist Glykeria. It was released in mid-2004 by Sony Music Greece. The album was certified Gold by IFPI Greece.

The album also includes several well-known collaborations including Kitrina Podilata, Antonis Vardis and Dimirtis Zervoudakis.

Track listing

Chart performance
Aniksi was a successful album in Cyprus and Greece, however the album was only certified Gold in Greece over 2 years after its release.

2004 albums
Glykeria albums
Greek-language albums
Sony Music Greece albums